Lepa Brena & Slatki Greh is a compilation album by Yugoslav pop-folk singer Lepa Brena and her band Slatki Greh. It was released in 1990.

Issued by Sarajevo-based label, Diskoton, the collection contains songs from the band's two most recent studio albums at the time: Hajde Da Se Volimo (Diskoton, 1987) and Četiri Godine (Diskoton, 1989). These two studio albums were each released in conjunction with a musical/comedy film (Hajde Da Se Volimo & Hajde Da Se Volimo II, respectively), starring lead singer, Lepa Brena. These films include performances of most (though not all) of the songs featured on their associated albums. 
Lepa Brena & Slatki Greh would go on to record a third album with Diskoton ("Boli Me Uvo Za Sve," 1990), in support of the third and final installment of the "Hajde Da Se Volimo" movie series. Diskoton ceased to operate during the early 1990s, and subsequently, no additional Lepa Brena & Slatki Greh albums or compilations were released on CD.

Track listing

1. Četiri godine

2. Biseru beli

3. Imam pesmu da vam pevam (Listed as "Imam pjesmu da vam pjevam")

4. Jugoslovenka

5. Ja pripadam samo tebi

6. Robinja

7. Zaželi sreću drugima

8. Hajde da se volimo

9. Golube

10. Evo zima će

11. Zbog tebe

12. Sanjam

13. Udri Mujo

14. On ne voli me

1-7: "Četiri godine," 1989;
8-14: "Hajde Da Se Volimo," 1987.

References

1990 compilation albums
Lepa Brena albums
Diskoton albums
Serbo-Croatian language albums